Il gabbiano (i.e. "The seagull") is a 1977 Italian drama film written and directed by Marco Bellocchio. It is loosely based on the Anton Chekhov's drama play The Seagull.

The film was screened out of competition at the 1977 Cannes Film Festival. For her performance Pamela Villoresi won a Grolla d'oro.

Plot
A young writer finds himself trapped between his mother (Laura Betti), a horrible actress, and the knowledge that he has only mediocre talent as a playwright and almost no character. After the young man suffers the loss of his mistress at the hands of his stepfather, also a novelist, his self-esteem is so shattered that he commits suicide.

Cast 

 Laura Betti as Arkadina 
 Pamela Villoresi as  Nina 
 Remo Girone as Kostja 
 Giulio Brogi as  Trigorin
 Gisella Burinato 		
 Antonio Piovanelli 	
 Clara Colosimo	
 Mattia Pinoli 		
 Remo Remotti

See also
 List of Italian films of 1977

References

External links

Italian drama films
1977 drama films
1977 films
Films directed by Marco Bellocchio
Films based on plays by Anton Chekhov
Films scored by Nicola Piovani

1978 in Italian television
1970s Italian films